The 2015–16 season is Petrolul Ploiești's 86th season in the Romanian football league system, and their fifth consecutive season in the Liga I. Petrolul came sixth in the 2014–15 Liga I. At the beginning of February 2015, due to president Capră still being under detention, the club faced financial problems and entered insolvency, meaning that the participation in UEFA Europa League and UEFA Champions League is denied.

Month by month review

June
Due to the financial problems, the club had to terminate or not extend the contracts of seventeen players, including Pablo de Lucas, Victoraș Astafei and Jean Sony Alcénat. On 3 June, Tibor Selymes became the head coach of "The Oilmen". On the 11th, the club's reorganisation plan was voted, therefore bankruptcy was avoided for the time being. Nike remained the kit manufacturer, while Superbet, a gambling company, replaced Alexandrion as the main sponsor of the team. "The Yellow Wolves" settled their pre-season training stage at Zlatibor, in the neighbouring country Serbia. The stage started on June 21 and ended on July 4. The club tested and signed new footballers during this period, generally ones who played in the French lower divisions, like Abdellah Zoubir, Ismail Hassan or Nicolas Farina. Ex-Dynamo Moscow midfielder Adrian Ropotan returned to Romania, six years after he left Dinamo București. Petrolul also convinced Brazilian goalkeeper Peterson Peçanha to extend his contract.

July
On 11 July, Petrolul played its first official game of the season against Steaua București, in the Liga I. The match ended goalless.

Players

First team squad

Out on loan

Transfers

In

Out

Competitions

Liga I

Regular season

Table

Position by round

Results by opponent

Last updated: 27 February 2016

Relegation round

Table

Position by round

Results by opponent

Last updated: 20 May 2016

Cupa României

Round of 32

Round of 16

Last updated: 1 December 2015

Cupa Ligii

Round of 16

Last updated: 9 September 2015

Squad statistics

Goals
Updated as of 20 May 2016

Pre-season and friendlies

Last updated: 3 July 2015

See also

2015–16 Cupa României
2015–16 Cupa Ligii
2015–16 Liga I

Notes and references

FC Petrolul Ploiești seasons
Petrolul Ploiești